Armin Gessert  (June 13, 1963 – November 8, 2009) was a computer game developer from Germany. Along with Manfred Trenz and Chris Hülsbeck, he was one of the developers behind the 1987 computer game The Great Giana Sisters for Commodore 64. His previous employers included the labels Rainbow Arts and Blue Byte.

In 1994 he established his own company, Spellbound Entertainment, which has released several titles, among them Desperados, Desperados 2 and Airline Tycoon. Gessert's last title, Great Giana Sisters DS, was released in 2009 in Germany and Australia.

Gessert died of a heart attack on November 8, 2009. He had been working in the video game industry for 25 years.

References

External links
 Spellbound Entertainment
 
 
 Confirmation of Gessert's death

1963 births
2009 deaths
20th-century German inventors
German video game designers
Video game programmers